This is a list of films produced in Oceania by country of origin.

Australia

Crocodile Dundee (1986)
Blinky Bill the Movie (2015)
The Wishmas Tree (2019)

Fiji
Flynn (1996)   
Pear ta ma 'on maf (2004)

New Zealand

The Lord of the Rings (2001-03)
Mosley (2019)

Niue
Niue: People of the Reef (2003)
Niue: Snake Island (2009)
Niue: Sons from Afar (2011)
Niue: This Is Your Land (2005)

Papua New Guinea
Black Harvest (1992) 
Bridewealth for a Goddess (2000) 
Ileksen (1979) 
Papa Bilong Chimbu (2007)
Sanctum (2011)
Tinpis Run (1991) 
Tukana - husat i asua (1983)
Wokabaut Bilong Tonten (1974), a.k.a. Tonten's Travels

Samoa
O Le Tulafale (The Orator) (2011 feature film)
Va Tapuia (Sacred Spaces) (2009 short film)

Tonga
Tavake (2006)

Vanuatu
Tanna (2015 feature film)

Oceania
Films